Hakaria is a genus of skink, a lizard in the family Scincidae. The genus contains one species, Hakaria simonyi, which is endemic to Socotra.

Etymology
The specific name, simonyi, is in honor of Viennese naturalist Oskar Simony (1852–1915).

Habitat

References

Further reading
Boulenger GA (1899). "The Expedition to Sokotra. II. Descriptions of the New Species of Reptiles". Bulletin of the Liverpool Museums 2 (1): 4–7. (Parachalcides socotranus, new species, p. 6).
Steindachner F (1899). "Über eine von Herrn Prof. O. Simony während der südarabischen Expedition in Sokotra entdeckte neue Sepsina-Art, die zugleich einer besonderen Subgattung (Hakaria) angehört, und charakterisirt dieselbe". Anzeiger der Kaiserlichen Akademie der Wissenschaften, Mathematischen-Naturwissenschaftenliche Classe 36: 161–162. ("Sepsina (Hakaria) Simonyi ", new species). (in German).

Skinks
Monotypic lizard genera
Endemic fauna of Socotra
Taxa named by Franz Steindachner